Leola C. Robinson-Simpson (born September 28, 1944) is an American politician. She is a former member of the South Carolina House of Representatives from the 25th District, serving since 2013. She is a member of the Democratic party. She chose not to run for re-election in 2022. Her seat was won by Wendell K. Jones in the 2022 general election after defeating opponents in the June Primary.

References

External links

Speech at Civil Rights Center Unveiling of Edwards vs. South Carolina Monument

Living people
1944 births
Democratic Party members of the South Carolina House of Representatives
21st-century American politicians

Women state legislators in South Carolina